George Sayer (c. 1655 – 21 May 1718) was an English courtier and politician  who sat in the House of Commons from 1695 to 1705.

Sayer was the son of Sir John Sayer of Bourchers Hall in Essex and his wife Katherine Van Piershill, daughter of John van Hossen van Piershill of Zealand. His father was page to the Prince of Orange and colonel of a foot regiment. Sayer was vice chamberlain to Queen Catherine, consort of Charles II and to Queen Mary. He became sub-governor and gentleman of the bedchamber to William Duke of Gloucester.

In 1695 Sayer  was elected Member of Parliament (MP) for Canterbury and held the seat until 1705.

Sayer died in 1718 and was buried in the church at Charing.

Sayer married Frances Honywood, daughter of Sir Philip Honywood, and through her acquired the estates at Petts.

References

1650s births
1718 deaths
Politics of Canterbury
Year of birth uncertain
People from Canterbury
English MPs 1695–1698
English MPs 1698–1700
English MPs 1701
English MPs 1701–1702
English MPs 1702–1705